CD Universe.com is an e-commerce site that sells music CDs, mp3 downloads, movies, and video games worldwide. CD Universe also offers a wide selection of miscellaneous items such as stuffed animals, jigsaw puzzles, board games, etc.

History
CD Universe was created in 1996 by founder and CEO Charles Beilman in Wallingford, Connecticut, United States, where it is still maintained and operated. CD Universe lists over 940,000 physical products and over 6 million downloadable songs.

In 1999, CD Universe was sold by Charles Beilman to eUniverse. Charles Beilman bought CD Universe back from eUniverse in October, 2000 after eUniverse decided they wanted to focus on their entertainment business (they eventually owned MySpace).

In 2009, CD Universe began selling digital music in the DRM-free mp3 format, through their relationship with Neurotic Media.

Mr. Beilman retired in January 2020.

Charity work
In September 2014, CD Universe began an effort to help raise money for the well known and fiscally responsible charity called Room to Read. CD Universe helps to support Room to Read's goal of teaching every child to read and write, thus breaking the cycle of poverty.

CD Universe also supports The American Red Cross. Visitors that donate using the link on their website will have their donations matched by CD Universe.

Website security
CD Universe protects its customers' sensitive information in the same way that all reputable online companies do: using SSL (Secure Sockets Layer). CD Universe experienced a security breach in December 1999.
 Although this security breach was a major setback for the company and its customers' trust, CD Universe was able to stay in business and proceeded with an investigation. The hacker, however, a Russian known only by the name of "Maxus", was never caught.

Since this incident, CD Universe reorganized its administration and the security features of its website. CD Universe is now monitored by outside companies such as McAfee who test their website daily for security gaps. The internet security provider Norton has also confirmed that CD Universe is a safe, secure place to shop online.

References

External links
 

Online music stores of the United States
Internet properties established in 1996